Pánuco Municipality is a municipality located in Zacatecas, Mexico.

Refereces

Municipalities of Zacatecas